1-Nonacosanol is a straight-chain aliphatic 29-carbon primary fatty alcohol.

References

Fatty alcohols
Alkanols